Suma Shirur (born 10 May 1974) is a former Indian shooter who competed in the 10 metre air rifle event. She is a joint world record holder in the event, having scored the maximum of 400 points in the qualification round, which she achieved at the 2004 Asian Shooting Championships in Kuala Lumpur. In 2003, she was awarded the Arjuna Award by the government of India. She is currently the High Performance Coach of the Indian Jr. Rifle Shooting Team. She is also the coach of 2020 Paralympics women's SH1 10m rifle gold and women's SH1 50m 3-position rifle bronze medalist Avani Lekhara On 30 November of 2022, she was conferred the Dronacharya Award by the 15th President of India, Droupadi Murmu.

Early life
Suma Betaraya Dixit was born on 10 May 1974, in Chikkaballapur, in the Karnataka state of India. She completed her education in Navi Mumbai, doing schooling in St. Xavier's High School, Nerul, Junior College in Fr. Agnel's Vashi and college education in South Indian Education Society graduating in Chemistry. During her graduation course, she was a part of the National Cadet Corps. This was when she discovered her interest in shooting and then on took to the sport under the watchful eyes of Dronacharya awardee Sanjay Chakraverty and Shri. B. P. Bam at the Maharashtra Rifle Association.

Career
In 1993, as a part of the Maharashtra Rifle Association, Shirur won three silver medals at the Maharashtra State Championship. Following her win at the Junior National Championships in 1994 in Chennai, she became the junior national champion. She then represented her home state of Karnataka at the 1997 National Games in Bangalore, where she won the gold medal in the 10 metre air rifle event.

Shirur made her name at the international stage winning medals at the 2002 Asian Games in Busan and the 2002 Commonwealth Games in Manchester, where she won medals in the individual and team events of 10 metre air rifle. At the 2004 Summer Olympics in Athens, Shirur stood eighth in the final, having scored a total of 497.2 points in the event. In the same year, at the Asian Athletics Championships in Kuala Lumpur, she created a joint world record in the qualification round, when she scored the maximum of 400 points. She went on to win the gold medal in the event, scoring a total of 502.3 points in the final. At the 2005 Championships in Bangkok, she won the bronze medal.

Following a hiatus, Shirur returned to competitive shooting in 2010, winning a gold medal at the InterShoot competition in the Netherlands.

Personal life
Shirur is married to Siddharth Shirur, an architect. In 2006, she founded the Lakshya Shooting Club in New Panvel, an organization to support budding shooters, with the mission of "Live for the glory of the game. Strive for perfection. Create and instill confidence, with sportsmanship spirit".

International participation & medals won
Asian Games 2002, Busan, South Korea | Silver Medal - 10 m air rifle team
Commonwealth Games 2002, Manchester | 2 Medals - Gold in 10 m air rifle pairs and Silver in 10 m air rifle individual event
Asian Shooting Championship 2004, Kuala lumper, Malaysia | Gold Medal -Individual
Asian Games 2006, Doha, Qatar | Bronze Medal - 10 m air rifle team
Asian Air Gun Championship 2008, Nanjing, China | Gold Medal
Hungarian Open 2008, Gyor, Hungary | Gold Medal
Intershoot 2008, Den HAAG, Netherlands | Gold Medal
Commonwealth Games 2010, New Delhi, India | Bronze Medal - 10 m air rifle pairs
Intershoot 2014, Den HAAG, Netherlands | Bronze Medal
Intershoot 2015, Den HAAG, Netherlands | Silver Medal
Asian Air Gun Championship 2016, Tehran | Silver Medal

Awards and recognition 
Shiv Chatrapati Krida Puraskar in 1996 by Govt of Maharashtra
Arjuna Award in 2003 by Govt of India
Sportswoman of the Year in 2005 by Hero Honda Sports Awards
Dronacharya Award in 2022 by Govt of India

References

External links
 
 
 

1974 births
Living people
Indian female sport shooters
ISSF rifle shooters
Olympic shooters of India
Shooters at the 2004 Summer Olympics
Commonwealth Games medallists in shooting
Commonwealth Games gold medallists for India
Commonwealth Games silver medallists for India
Commonwealth Games bronze medallists for India
Shooters at the 2002 Commonwealth Games
Shooters at the 2010 Commonwealth Games
Asian Games medalists in shooting
Asian Games silver medalists for India
Asian Games bronze medalists for India
Shooters at the 2002 Asian Games
Shooters at the 2006 Asian Games
Shooters at the 2010 Asian Games
Medalists at the 2002 Asian Games
Medalists at the 2006 Asian Games
21st-century Indian women
21st-century Indian people
People from Chikkaballapur
Sportswomen from Karnataka
Recipients of the Arjuna Award
Recipients of the Dronacharya Award
Medallists at the 2002 Commonwealth Games
Medallists at the 2010 Commonwealth Games